Michael John Hicks Beach, 2nd Earl St Aldwyn  (9 October 191229 January 1992) was a British Conservative politician. He achieved the distinction of serving in the governments of five different prime ministers.

Background and education
St Aldwyn was the only son of Michael Hicks Beach, Viscount Quenington, who was killed in action in 1916, and the grandson of Michael Hicks Beach, 1st Earl St Aldwyn. His mother was Marjorie Brocklehurst, who also died in 1916, daughter of Henry Dent Brocklehurst. He succeeded his grandfather in the earldom in April 1916, aged only three. St Aldwyn was educated at Eton and later fought in the Second World War as a Major in the 1st Royal Gloucestershire Hussars.

Political career
In 1954 St Aldwyn was appointed Joint Parliamentary Secretary to the Ministry of Agriculture and Fisheries in the Conservative administration of Winston Churchill, a post he also held under Anthony Eden and Harold Macmillan (the ministry was renamed the Ministry of Agriculture, Fisheries and Food in 1955).

In 1958 Macmillan promoted him to Captain of the Honourable Corps of Gentlemen-at-Arms (chief government whip in the House of Lords). He retained this post also under Sir Alec Douglas-Home from 1963 to 1964. After the Conservatives lost power in 1964 he served as Chief Opposition Whip in the House of Lords from 1964 to 1970. When the Conservatives returned to power in 1970 under Edward Heath, St Aldwyn was again appointed Captain of the Honourable Corps of Gentlemen-at-Arms, which he remained until the government fell in 1974.

Between 1974 and 1978 he was again Chief Opposition Whip in the House of Lords. Apart from his political career he was also a Justice of the Peace and Deputy Lieutenant of Gloucestershire and served as Vice Lord-Lieutenant of Gloucestershire from 1981 to 1987. He was sworn of the Privy Council in 1959, appointed a KBE in 1964 and a GBE in 1980.

Marriage and children
Lord St Aldwyn married Diana Mary Christian Mills, daughter of Henry Christian George Mills, on 26 June 1948. They had three sons:

 Michael Henry Hicks-Beach, 3rd Earl St Aldwyn (born 7 February 1950).
 Hon Peter Hugh Hicks-Beach (born 31 May 1952).
 Hon David Seymour Hicks-Beach (born 25 May 1955).

Lord St Aldwyn died in January 1992, aged 79, and was succeeded by his eldest son Michael.

References

Kidd, Charles, Williamson, David (editors). Debrett's Peerage and Baronetage (1990 edition). New York: St Martin's Press, 1990.

External links

|-

|-

|-

1912 births
1992 deaths
2
People educated at Eton College
Conservative Party (UK) hereditary peers
Deputy Lieutenants of Gloucestershire
Members of the Privy Council of the United Kingdom
Royal Gloucestershire Hussars officers
British Army personnel of World War II
Honourable Corps of Gentlemen at Arms
Michael
Ministers in the third Churchill government, 1951–1955
Ministers in the Eden government, 1955–1957
Ministers in the Macmillan and Douglas-Home governments, 1957–1964